is a railway station on the Kagoshima Main Line operated by JR Kyushu in Nagasu, Kumamoto Prefecture, Japan.

Lines 
Both local and rapid services on the line stop at the station.

Layout 
The station consists of a side and an island platform serving three tracks. The station building is a hashigami structure with the various station facilities such as the ticket window, waiting area and ticket gates located on a bridge which spans the tracks. The bridge has entrances on both the south and north side of the tracks. Access to the facilities on the bridge and from the bridge to the platforms is by means of various flights of steps.

Management of the station has been outsourced to the JR Kyushu Tetsudou Eigyou Co., a wholly owned subsidiary of JR Kyushu specialising in station services. It staffs the ticket counter which is equipped with a Midori no Madoguchi facility.

Adjacent stations

History
In the next phase of expansion, the track was extended south to Takase (now ) opening as the new southern terminus on 1 April 1891. Nagasu was opened on the same day as one of several intermediate stations on the new stretch of track. When the Kyushu Railway was nationalized on 1 July 1907, Japanese Government Railways (JGR) took over control of the station. On 12 October 1909, the station became part of the Hitoyoshi Main Line and then on 21 November 1909, part of the Kagoshima Main Line. With the privatization of Japanese National Railways (JNR), the successor of JGR, on 1 April 1987, JR Kyushu took over control of the station.

Passenger statistics
In fiscal 2016, the station was used by an average of 735 passengers daily (boarding passengers only), and it ranked 199th among the busiest stations of JR Kyushu.

References

External links
Nagasu Station (JR Kyushu)

Railway stations in Kumamoto Prefecture
Railway stations in Japan opened in 1891